Hoplitis incanescens is a species of bee in the family Megachilidae. It is found in North America.

Subspecies
These two subspecies belong to the species Hoplitis incanescens:
 Hoplitis incanescens incanescens
 Hoplitis incanescens tota

References

Further reading

 
 

Megachilidae
Articles created by Qbugbot
Insects described in 1922